Ryan Bethencourt (March 18, 1979) is an American scientist, entrepreneur, and biohacker best known for his work as co-founder and CEO of Wild Earth, Partner at Babel Ventures and cofounder and former Program Director at IndieBio, a biology accelerator and early stage seed fund. Bethencourt was head of life sciences at the XPRIZE foundation, a co-founder and CEO of Berkeley Biolabs, a biotech accelerator, and Halpin Neurosciences, an ALS therapeutics-focused biotech company. Bethencourt co-founded Counter Culture Labs, a citizen science nonprofit, and Sudo Room, a hacker space based in downtown Oakland, California.

Bethencourt is a vegan and has worked on the development of several sustainable and cruelty-free products.

Early life
Bethencourt has worked over the last decade in the biopharmaceutical industry to partner on and develop novel drugs from first IND submission to FDA approval with many major biopharmas including Pfizer, AZ, J&J, Sanofi, Takeda, Amgen, Genentech, and other companies in the U.S., E.U., and Japan. He has also served as COO at Genescient Pharmaceuticals, a longevity focused biotech startup and CEO of Halpin Neurosciences, an ALS focused startup. Bethencourt’s work has been featured in Wired, TechCrunch, Forbes, the San Francisco Business Times, and other publications. He regularly speaks on biotech innovation and writes for Biocoder, an O’Reilly Media publication. He's also an author of Forbes, Techonomy and Huffington Post.

Since Bethencourt co-founded IndieBio in 2014, he and his team have funded 68 biotech startups, including companies building the post-animal bioeconomy: The EVERY Company, Memphis Meats, Gelzen, New Wave, and Pembient. He's also an advisor of The Good Food Institute.

Education
Bethencourt has a BSc degree in Biological Sciences (Molecular Genetics) from Warwick University in the United Kingdom. He also has a Masters in Bioscience Enterprise (MBE) from Cambridge University (2002 – 2003). This masters course was the first of its kind in the UK (launched in 2002) and it was a fusion of the MBA/Biotech courses and launched in partnership with Harvard and MIT.  He has also been a Doctor of Philosophy (PhD) Candidate at the Center for Regenerative Medicine at the University of Edinburgh in 2003 working on stem cell differentiation. .

Companies invested and co-founded
 NERD Skincare
 Gelzen
 V-Sense Medical
 Memphis Meats
 Vali Nanomedical
 INDEE
 Truust
 Koniku
 Girihlet
 MYi
 Circularis
 New Wave Foods
 Amino BioLabs
 Gene and Cell Technologies

Advised:
 Berkeley ultrasound

Co Founded:
 Sudo Room
 Counter Culture Labs
 Berkeley Biolabs
 LAbLaunch
 IndieBIo
 Wild Earth

Global Forum 2015

Bethencourt joined the Global Forum 2015 as one of the speakers. The Global Forum on Research and Innovation for Health 2015, aimed to identify solutions to the world’s unmet health needs through research and innovation. The said forum was held on August 24–27, 2015 at Philippines International Convention Center(PICC), Metro Manila, Philippines. Bethencourt spoke about the topic of "Increasing public expenditure on research and innovation in emerging economies" and "Increasing investments for innovative andpractical solutions to priority healthcare".

Pioneers Asia 2016

Bethencourt was a part of Pioneers Asia 2016 on Mar 23, 2016 at Tokyo, Japan . Pioneers facilitates profound business relationships between tech innovators. The event was for tech entrepreneurs, investors, top executives, thought-leaders, and international media from Europe to Asia, Middle East, and beyond. Bethencourt spoke about BIOTECH FOR THE WORLD OF THE FUTURE. He also moderated the life sciences and agriculture topic on the said event.

References

1979 births
21st-century American businesspeople
American veganism activists
Biotechnologists
Living people